Castle Semple Rowing Club is a rowing club on the Castle Semple Loch, based at Lochwinnoch, Renfrewshire, Central Lowlands, Scotland. The club is affiliated to Scottish Rowing.

History
The club won the Queen's Award for Voluntary Service in 2015.

The club has produced multiple British champions.

Honours

British champions

References

Sport in Renfrewshire
Rowing clubs in Scotland